Tod Sacerdoti is an American businessperson. He served as Founder and CEO of BrightRoll between 2006 and 2014, which his company was purchased by Yahoo! for $640M. He then served as Vice President, Display and Video Advertising Products of Yahoo until 2017.

Education
During high school Sacerdoti was a competitive badminton player. Sacerdoti received his undergraduate education from Yale University, where he served as the president of the fraternity Sigma Alpha Epsilon, and then received an MBA from the Stanford Graduate School of Business.

Career
Sacerdoti began his career as an investment banking analyst at Robertson Stephens. He later worked as Director of Business Development at Spoke Software, and eventually at Plaxo as Director of Revenue and Business Development. In 2006 he founded the company BrightRoll with business partner Dru Nelson, and served as the company’s CEO.

In 2014 Sacerdoti sold BrightRoll to Yahoo for $640 million. Following this, he joined Yahoo and served as the company’s Vice President, Display and Video Advertising Products. In 2016, Sacerdoti was one of the key figures on the response team to various public technical problems and ad traffic issues. Sacerdoti has stated that traditional media is unable to keep up with digital media in terms of ad revenue, largely because of software that automates ad selling and buying. He has also been an investor in other private companies.

Recognition
In 2012 Sacerdoti was named to the forty under forty of the San Francisco Business Times. He then received a Bronze Stevie Award for innovator of the year in computer software in 2013. In 2014 Sacerdoti was awarded the EY Entrepreneur of the Year – Media, Entertainment and Communications Award.

References

Living people
Yale University alumni
Stanford University alumni
Yahoo! people
Year of birth missing (living people)